Landingville is a borough in Schuylkill County, Pennsylvania, United States. The population was 137 at the time of the 2020 census.

Geography
Landingville is located at  (40.626509, -76.123342).

Demographics

As of the census of 2000, there were 175 people, 68 households, and 45 families residing in the borough.

The population density was 207.6 people per square mile (80.4/km2). There were 74 housing units at an average density of 87.8 per square mile (34.0/km2).

The racial makeup of the borough was 99.43% White, and 0.57% from two or more races.

There were 68 households, out of which 35.3% had children under the age of eighteen living with them; 54.4% were married couples living together, 11.8% had a female householder with no husband present, and 32.4% were non-families. 25.0% of all households were made up of individuals, and 13.2% had someone living alone who was sixty-five years of age or older.

The average household size was 2.57 and the average family size was 3.04.

In the borough the population was spread out, with 25.7% under the age of eighteen, 8.6% from eighteen to twenty-four, 28.6% from twenty-five to forty-four, 25.7% from forty-five to sixty-four, and 11.4% who were sixty-five years of age or older. The median age was thirty-seven years.

For every one hundred females, there were 88.2 males. For every one hundred females aged eighteen and over, there were 78.1 males.

The median income for a household in the borough was $40,417, and the median income for a family was $41,667. Males had a median income of $33,571 compared with that of $18,750 for females.

The per capita income for the borough was $16,965.

Roughly 4.2% of families and 9.5% of the population were living below the poverty line, including 12.8% of those who were under the age of eighteen and 21.4% of those who were aged sixty-five or over.

Gallery

References

Populated places established in 1887
Boroughs in Schuylkill County, Pennsylvania
Populated places on the Schuylkill River
1887 establishments in Pennsylvania